Street of Dreams is the second studio album by Swedish folk musician Sofia Talvik. Released in 2007, it features the single "It's Just Love", which was recorded as a duet by Talvik and Bernard Butler.

Track listing

References

External links
 Street of Dreams by Sofia Talvik on Bandcamp

2007 albums
Sofia Talvik albums